Red One is an upcoming American action-adventure Christmas film, directed by Jake Kasdan, with a script written by Chris Morgan, from an original story by Hiram Garcia. The film stars Dwayne Johnson and Chris Evans in the lead roles, and features Kiernan Shipka, Lucy Liu, Mary Elizabeth Ellis, J. K. Simmons, Nick Kroll and Kristofer Hivju in supporting roles. Johnson, Hiram Garcia, Dany Garcia, Kasdan, Melvin Mar, and Morgan serve as producers.

The project is seen as the first of a potential franchise, reimagining holiday mythology. The project will be a joint-venture production between Seven Bucks Productions, Amazon Studios, Amazon Prime Original Films, The Detective Agency, and Chris Morgan Productions.

Red One is scheduled to be released exclusively as an Amazon Prime Video original film in the 2023 holiday season.

Cast 
 Dwayne Johnson as Callum Drift
 Chris Evans as Jack O'Malley
 Kiernan Shipka
 Lucy Liu
 Mary Elizabeth Ellis
 J. K. Simmons as Santa Claus
 Nick Kroll
 Kristofer Hivju
 Wesley Kimmel
 Bonnie Hunt as Mrs. Claus

Production 
Hiram Garcia at Seven Bucks Productions conceived the idea for the film. Jake Kasdan will direct and write. Chris Evans joined the cast in January 2022. In September, Kiernan Shipka was added to the cast. Lucy Liu, Mary Elizabeth Ellis, J. K. Simmons, Nick Kroll, Kristofer Hivju, Wesley Kimmel and Bonnie Hunt joined the cast the following month, with Ellis revealing her and Simmons involvement on Instagram.

Filming began in October 2022 in Atlanta and wrapped in February 2023.

References

External links
 

2023 action films
Amazon Studios films
American action adventure films
American Christmas films
Films set in Florida
Films shot in Atlanta
Upcoming English-language films
Films directed by Jake Kasdan
Seven Bucks Productions films